This is a list of player transfers involving Major League Rugby teams that occurred from the end of the 2018 season and through the 2019 season. The league confirmed the additions of two teams for the 2019 season, Rugby United New York and the Toronto Arrows.

Austin Elite

Players in
 Dominique Bailey from  Chicago Lions
 Simon Bienvenu from  Racing 92
 Simon Courcoul from  Grasse
  Juan Echeverría from  Old Christians
 Tiaan Erasmus from  CUT Ixias
  Doug Fraser from  Castaway Wanderers
  Sebastián Kalm from  New Orleans Gold
  Soheyl Jaoudat from  Clermont
  Travis Larsen from  James Bay
  Josh Larsen from  Otago
 Dylan Pieterse from  Boland Cavaliers
 Brendan Rams from  Austin Blacks
 Rodrigo Silva from  Carrasco Polo
 Peni Tagive from  Old Blue
 Marcelo Torrealba from  Chile 7s
 Andrés Vilaseca from  Old Boys
 LaRome White from  Seattle Seawolves
  Rikus Zwart from  Griffons

Players out
  Mike Brown to  Rugby United New York
  Victor Comptat to  Houston Sabercats
  Ross Deacon to  Rugby United New York
  Robert Drummond to  Austin Huns
  Tim Fitzgerald to  Austin Huns
  Hanco Germishuys to  Glendale Raptors
  David LeMasters to  Austin Huns
  Pita Naruma to  Austin Huns
  Paddy Ryan to  Rugby United New York
 Louis Stanfill to  San Diego Legion
  Roland Suniula to  Seattle Seawolves
  Marcus Walsh to  Rugby United New York
  Pedrie Wannenburg retired.

Glendale Raptors

Players in
  Malon Al-Jiboori from  San Diego Legion
  Marco Fepulea'i from  Auckland

 Chad Gough from  University of Utah
 Colin Gregory from  Clemson University
 Campbell Johnstone from  Mount St. Mary's University
 Max Lum from  Wheeling Jesuit
  Dwayne Pienaar from  Roodepoort Rugby Club
  Noah Barker from  James Bay AA 

Players out
 Bryce Campbell to  London Irish
 Jake Christmann to  Utah Warriors
 Dylan Fawsitt to  Rugby United New York
 Sam Figg to  NSW Country Eagles
 Grigor Kerdikoshvili to  Lelo Saracens
 Ben Landry to  Ealing Trailfinders
 John Quill to  Rugby United New York

Houston SaberCats

Players in

  Matt Almeida from  South Valley Bucks
  Santiago Arata from  Old Christians
  Luke Beauchamp from  Queensland Country
  Victor Comptat from  Austin Elite
  Charlie Connolly from  RGC 1404
  Amro Gouda from  New Orleans Gold
  Jason Harris-Wright from  Bristol
  Diego Magno from  MVCC
  Alejandro Nieto from  Champagnat
  Pat O'Toole from  San Diego Legion
  Mateo Sanguinetti from  Los Cuervos
  Ayron Schramm from  Heidelberger RK 
  Max Tacket from  Burnaby Lake
 Paul Mullen from  Newcastle Falcons
 

Players out
 Justin Allen to  Rotherham Titans
 Kenneth Hepburn retired.
  Adam Macklin retired.
  Diego Maquieira to  New England Free Jacks

  Chris Slater to  New England Free Jacks
  Lindsey Stevens to  Eastern Suburbs RUFC
  Kyle Sumsion to  Rugby United New York

Notes:

New Orleans Gold

Players in
 Kyle Baillie from  London Scottish
 Tristan Blewett from  Southern Kings
 Cam Dolan from  Nottingham
 Ignacio Dotti from  Los Cuervos
 Nick Feakes from  Lindenwood University
 Con Foley from  
  Scott Gale from  University of Queensland
  Matt Harmon from  Lindenwood University
  Malcolm May from  Penn State University
  Kevin Sullivan from  University of California
  Kane Thompson from  Taranaki

Players out
  Amro Gouda to  Houston SaberCats
  Matt Hughston to  New England Free Jacks
  Sebastián Kalm to  Austin Elite
  Myles McQuone to  New England Free Jacks
  Matt Wirken to  Rugby United New York

Rugby United New York

Players in
 Ross Deacon from  Austin Elite
 Dylan Fawsitt from  Glendale Raptors
 Ben Foden from  Northampton Saints
 Matt Hughston from  New England Free Jacks
  Will Leonard from  Shannon RFC
  Callum Mackintosh from  Currie Chieftains
 Cathal Marsh from  Leinster
  Chris Mattina from  USA 7s
  Myles McQuone from  New England Free Jacks
  Mark O'Keeffe from  Lansdowne
  James Rochford from  Munster
  Paddy Ryan  Austin Elite
  Marcus Satavu from  Brooklyn Kings
  Seimou Smith from  New Haven Old Blacks
  Kyle Sumsion from  Houston SaberCats
 Marcus Walsh from  Austin Elite
  Matt Wirken from  New Orleans Gold

Players out
 TBC

San Diego Legion

Players in
  Tai Enosa from San Francisco Golden Gate RFC
  Liam Hallam-Eames from  Manawatu Turbos
  Conor Kearns from  Trinity College
  Dean Muir from  Kintetsu Liners
  Keni Nasoqeqe from  Belmont Shore RFC
  Kapeli Pifeleti from  Saracens
  Paddy Ryan from  Munakata Sanix Blues
  Matt Sandell from  NSW Waratahs
  Louis Stanfill from  Austin Elite
  Save Totovosau from  Easts Tigers
  Jasa Veremalua from  Fiji 7s

Players out
  Malon Al-Jiboori to  Glendale Raptors
  Ben Cima to  New England Free Jacks
 Cam Dolan to  Nottingham
 Tony Lamborn to  Southland
  Tadhg Leader  to  New England Free Jacks
  Chris Mattina to USA 7s
  Pat O'Toole to  Houston SaberCats
  Anthony Purpura to  New England Free Jacks
  Anthony Salaber retired.
  Takudzwa Ngwenya released
  Dolph Botha released
  Josh Zamudio released
  Tasi Toilolo released
  Mungo Mason released
  Patrick Walls released
  Lance Lamprecht released
  Faitala Talapusi released
  Cody Melphy released
  Sione Lutoi released
  Garrett Brewer released
  Austin Switzer released
  Naima Fuala’au released

Notes:

Seattle Seawolves

Players in
  Ben Cima from  New England Free Jacks.
  Stephan Coetzee from  Southern Kings
  Roland Suniula from  Austin Elite
  Djustice Sears-Duru from  Toronto Arrows
  JP Smith from  Eastern Province Elephants
  Apisai Naikatini from  Aubenas
  Brad Tucker from  Manawatu

Players out
  Peter Smith to  Toronto Arrows (as backs coach) retired.
  Ray Barkwill retired.

Toronto Arrows

Players in
  Jack Evans from  Llandovery
  Gastón Mieres from  Lobos Rugby Club
  Morgan Mitchell from  Southland
  Sam Malcolm from   Manawatu
  Dan Moor from  Yorkshire Carnegie
  Leandro Leivas from  Old Christians
  Jack Nay from  Saracens RFC (loan)

Players out
  Djustice Sears-Duru to  Seattle Seawolves

Utah Warriors

Players in
  Jake Christmann from  Glendale Raptors
  Gannon Moore from  North Harbour
  Josh Reeves from  Bandeirantes
  Ian Luciano from  Mystic River Rugby Club

Players out
 Paul Lasike to  Harlequins
 Kurt Morath to  Doncaster Knights
 David Tameilau to  Glasgow Warriors

See also
List of 2019–20 Major League Rugby transfers
List of 2018–19 Premiership Rugby transfers
List of 2018–19 RFU Championship transfers
List of 2018–19 Super Rugby transfers
List of 2018–19 Pro14 transfers
List of 2018–19 Top 14 transfers

References

Major League Rugby